Events from the year 1729 in art.

Events
 Works of art from Rome arrive in Dresden, leading to the establishment of the Skulpturensammlung.
 Pierre-Jean Mariette publishes the first volume of the Cabinet Crozat, a catalogue of works in the collection of Pierre Crozat.

Paintings
 William Hogarth paints Act III of The Beggar's Opera.
 François Lemoyne paints Pygmalion Watching his Statue Come to Life.
 Antonio David paints portraits of Prince Charles Edward Stuart ("Bonnie Prince Charlie") and his brother Prince Henry.
 Nicolas de Largillière (Paris) paints a portrait of Elizabeth Throckmorton.
 Andreas Møller probably paints a portrait of the Archduchess Maria Theresa of Austria.
 A painter of the "Nasini circle" paints the Miracle of San Vincenzo Ferrer.

Births
 January 5 – Paulus Constantijn la Fargue, Dutch painter, etcher and draftsman (died 1782)
 January 17 – Giovanni Antonio Zaddei, Italian painter of altarpieces, mainly active in Ferrara (died unknown)
 March 24 – Simon Mathurin Lantara, French landscape painter (died 1778)
 April 13 – Rienk Jelgerhuis, Dutch painter, engraver and draftsman (died 1806)
 May 7 – Pierre-Joseph Lion, Belgian painter (died 1809)
 date unknown
 Joseph Antony Adolph, Moravian painter (died 1762)
 Jean-Baptiste Defernex, French sculptor especially of portrait busts (died 1783)
 Jean-Baptiste-Henri Deshays, French painter (died 1765)
 Vinzenz Fischer, Austrian historical painter and professor of architecture (died 1810)
 Saverio Gandini, Italian painter (died 1796)
 James MacArdell, Irish engraver of mezzotints (died 1765)
 Hughes Taraval, French painter (died 1785)

Deaths
 January 21 – Marco Ricci, Italian veduta painter (born 1676)
 March 2 – Peter Van Dievoet, Belgian sculptor and designer of ornamental architectural features (born 1661)
 March 9 – Henrietta Johnston, early American pastellist (born 1670)
 April 26 – John Nost, Flemish sculptor especially utilizing lead (born unknown)
 August 22 – Torii Kiyonobu I, Japanese painter and printmaker in the ukiyo-e style, especially on Kabuki signboards (born 1664)
 October 2 - Arnold Boonen, Dutch portrait painter (born 1669)
 October 22 - Anna Maria Ehrenstrahl, Swedish painter of allegories, portraits and group portraits (born 1666)
 November 16 - Alessandro Specchi, Italian architect and engraver (born 1668)
 December 24 – Marcantonio Franceschini, Italian painter of religious and mythological subjects (born 1648)
 date unknown
 Scipione Angelini, Italian painter of still-lifes (born 1661)
 Panagiotis Doxaras, Greek painter who founded the Heptanese School of Greek art (born 1662)
 Lorenzo Fratellini, Italian painter of miniature portraits (born 1690)
 Cristóbal de León, Spanish painter of monastic portraits (born unknown)
 Krzysztof Lubieniecki – Polish Baroque painter and engraver (born 1659)

 
Years of the 18th century in art
1720s in art